St. Thomas' Church, St. Thomas Chapel, Church of St Thomas, the Apostle or Mar Thoma, Christian church buildings or ecclesiastical parishes under the patronage of Saint Thomas the Apostle, Saint Thomas of Canterbury, Saint Thomas Aquinas, or Saint Thomas More.

Church buildings under the patronage of Saint Thomas the Apostle

Australia
St Thomas' Anglican Church, Mulgoa
St Thomas' Anglican Church, Narellan
St Thomas' Anglican Church, North Sydney
Liberal Catholic Church of Saint Thomas, Melba, Canberra, Australian Capital Territory

Canada
 St. Thomas' Anglican Church (Moose Factory, Ontario)
 St. Thomas Anglican Church (Shanty Bay, Ontario)
 St. Thomas's Anglican Church (Toronto), Ontario

Czech Republic
Church of St. Thomas (Brno)

Denmark
St Thomas' Church, Copenhagen

France
St Thomas' Church, Strasbourg
St Thomas' Church, Landerneau

Germany
St. Thomas, Berlin
St. Thomas Church, Leipzig, workplace of J.S. Bach

India
St. Thomas Church, Palayoor
St. Thomas Church Mylacombu
St. Thomas Cathedral, Mumbai
St. Thomas Church, Kolkata
St. Thomas Cathedral Basilica, Chennai, or National Shrine of St. Thomas
St. Thomas Evangelical Church of India, Kerala
St. Thomas Mar Thoma Church, Pallipad
St. Thomas Church, Hisar
Mar Thoma Syrian Church, Kerala

Italy
Church of St. Thomas, Alcamo, Trapani, Sicily

Israel
St. Thomas Church, Jerusalem

Ireland
St Thomas the Apostle parish, Laurel Lodge, Blanchardstown, Dublin

Norway
St. Thomas Church, Filefjell

Pakistan
Saint Thomas' Church, Dera Ismail Khan

Philippines
 Saint Thomas the Apostle Parish, Santo Tomas, Pampanga

Slovenia
St. Thomas's Church (Rateče), Kranjska Gora, Slovenia

United Kingdom
 St Thomas' Church, Ashton-in-Makerfield, Greater Manchester
 St Thomas' Church, Belfast, Northern Ireland
 St Thomas' Church, Blackburn (demolished), Lancashire
 St Thomas' Church, Blackpool, Lancashire
 St Thomas' Church, Coventry, West Midlands
 St Thomas' Church, Crookes, Sheffield
 St Thomas' Church, East Shefford, Berkshire
 St Thomas' Church, Eaton, Cheshire
 St Thomas' Church, Friarmere, Delph, Greater Manchester
 St Thomas' Church, Garstang, Lancashire
 St Thomas' Church, Halliwell, Bolton, Greater Manchester
 St Thomas' Church, Henbury, Cheshire
 St Thomas' Church, Kendal, Cumbria
 St Thomas' Church, Lancaster, Lancashire
 St Thomas' Church, Lydiate, Sefton, Merseyside
 St. Thomas' Church, Mellor, Greater Manchester
 St Thomas' Church, Milnthorpe, Cumbria
 St Thomas' Church, Parkgate, Cheshire
 St Thomas' Church, Pendleton, Salford
 St Thomas' Church, Plaistow, Plaistow, Newham
 St Thomas' Church, Preston, Lancashire
 St Thomas' Church, St Anne's-on-the-Sea, Lancashire
 St Thomas' Church, Stockport, Greater Manchester
 St Thomas' Church, Stockton Heath, Warrington, Cheshire
 St Thomas's Church, Aslockton, Nottinghamshire
 St Thomas's Church, Huddersfield, Leeds
 St Thomas's Church, Oakwood, London
 St Thomas's Church, West Ham, London
 St Thomas Church, Winchester
 St Thomas the Apostle, Hanwell, Ealing, London
 St Thomas the Apostle, London
 St Thomas the Apostle Rural, Cornwall
 Sts Thomas Minster, Isle of Wight
 St Thomas's RC Church in Keith, Moray

United States

 St. Thomas Syro Malabar Catholic Forane Church, Philadelphia, PA
 St. Thomas Anglican Church (Mountain Home, Arkansas)
 St. Thomas the Apostle Hollywood, California
 St. Thomas the Apostle Catholic Church (Los Angeles)
 St. Thomas Episcopal Church (Alamosa, Colorado)
 St. Thomas Episcopal Church (Newark, Delaware)
 St. Thomas African Methodist Episcopal Church, Hawkinsville, Georgia
 St. Thomas Catholic Church (Coeur d'Alene, Idaho), National Register of Historic Places in Kootenai County, Idaho
 St. Thomas Church and Convent, Chicago, Illinois
 St. Thomas Episcopal Church (Sioux City, Iowa)
 Church of St Thomas, the Apostle and Howard-Flaget House, Bardstown, Kentucky
 St. Thomas Episcopal Church (Beattyville, Kentucky)
 St. Thomas Church (Owings Mills, Maryland)
 St. Thomas' Church (Upper Marlboro, Maryland)
 St. Thomas Episcopal Church (Taunton, Massachusetts)
 St. Thomas the Apostle Catholic Church (Ann Arbor, Michigan)
 St. Thomas the Apostle Catholic Church (Detroit)
 St. Thomas Episcopal Church (Dover, New Hampshire)
 St. Thomas Episcopal Church (Glassboro, New Jersey)
 St. Thomas Episcopal Church (Amenia Union, New York)
 Saint Thomas' Chapel (East Hampton, New York)
 St. Thomas' Episcopal Church Complex (Mamaroneck, New York)
 Saint Thomas Church (Manhattan), New York
 St. Thomas Episcopal Church (New Windsor, New York)
 St. Thomas Episcopal Church (Pittstown, New Jersey)
 St. Thomas Episcopal Church (Slaterville Springs, New York)
 St. Thomas Episcopal Church (Bath, North Carolina)
 St. Thomas Episcopal Church (Port Clinton, Ohio)
 St. Thomas Episcopal Church (Terrace Park, Ohio)
 St. Thomas Primitive Baptist Church, Summit, Oklahoma
 St. Thomas' Episcopal Church (Canyon City, Oregon)
 St. Thomas the Apostle Church, Glen Mills, Pennsylvania
 African Episcopal Church of St. Thomas, Philadelphia, Pennsylvania
 St. Thomas' Church, Whitemarsh, Pennsylvania
 St. Thomas Church (Brownsville, Texas)
 St. Thomas Church (Underhill, Vermont)
 St. Thomas Chapel (Middletown, Virginia), or St. Thomas Church
 St. Thomas Church (Orange, Virginia)
 Church of St. Thomas the Apostle, Beloit, Wisconsin

Church buildings under the patronage of Saint Thomas of Canterbury

In the United Kingdom
Cathedral Church of St Thomas of Canterbury, commonly known as Portsmouth Cathedral
Church of St Thomas à Becket, Box
St Thomas the Martyr, Bristol
Church of St Thomas à Becket, Capel
St Thomas of Canterbury Church, Chester
St Thomas Church, Dudley
Church of St Thomas the Martyr, Newcastle upon Tyne
Sts Thomas Minster, Newport, Isle of Wight, which may ambiguously have St Thomas à Becket or St Thomas the Apostle as its patron
St Thomas the Martyr's Church, Oxford
St Thomas à Becket Church, Pensford
St Thomas' Church, Southwark
Church of St Thomas the Martyr, Upholland
St Thomas à Becket Church, Warblington
St Thomas à Becket Church, Widcombe
Church of St Thomas à Becket, Wolvesnewton

Church buildings under the patronage of Saint Thomas Aquinas

Australia 
St Thomas Aquinas Church, Springwood

Canada 
 St. Thomas Aquinas Church, Toronto

France 
 Saint Thomas Aquinas Church, Paris

Philippines
 Saint Thomas Aquinas Parish Church, Santo Tomas, Batangas
 Saint Thomas Aquinas Parish Church, Mangaldan, Pangasinan
 Saint Thomas Aquinas Parish Church, Santo Tomas, Pangasinan

Spain 
 Saint Thomas Aquinas Church, Zaragoza

United Kingdom 
 St Thomas Aquinas Church, Ham, London

United States
 St. Thomas Aquinas Chapel (Ojai, California)
 St. Thomas Aquinas Church (Palo Alto, California)
 St. Thomas Aquinas Church (Fairfield, Connecticut)
 St. Thomas Aquinas Church (Zanesville, Ohio)
 Saint Thomas Aquinas Cathedral, Reno, Nevada

Church buildings under the patronage of Saint Thomas More 

 St. Thomas More Church (New York City)

See also
Cathedral of Saint Thomas (disambiguation)
St. Thomas Synagogue, Charlotte, Virgin Islands
St. Thomas Mount, Chennai
St Thomas à Becket Church (disambiguation), named after Saint Thomas Becket
St. Thomas Aquinas Church (disambiguation), named after Saint Thomas Aquinas